Anne Hill is a hill.

Anne Hill may also refer to:

Queen Anne Hill, Seattle
Anne Hill Carter Lee (1773–1829), ne Anne Hill, first lady of Virginia
Anne Hill (novelist), pseudonym by Netta Muskett
Lady Anne Hill (née Gathorne-Hardy, 1911–2006), British bookseller
Anne Hill (actress) (1804–1896), dancer and actress
Anne T. Hill (1916–1999), American fashion designer and yoga teacher

See also
Anne Hills (born 1953), American singer-songwriter